The Dialogue with Trypho, along with the First and Second Apologies, is a second-century Christian apologetic text, usually agreed to be dated in between AD 155-160. It is seen as documenting the attempts by theologian Justin Martyr to show that Christianity is the new law for all men, and to prove from Scripture that Jesus is the Messiah.

The Dialogue utilizes the literary device of an intellectual conversation between Justin and Trypho, a Jew. The concluding section propounds that the Christians are the true people of God.

Identity of Trypho

The identity of Trypho as rabbi Tarfon - the Hebrew name 'Tarfon' itself is likely derived from Greek Trifon (Trypho) - has been proposed, but many Jewish scholars do not accept the notion that Justin Martyr's Trypho is Tarfon. They instead consider Trypho a fictional character invented by Justin for his literary purposes.

Setting and structure
The setting is presented as a chance meeting between Justin and Trypho in Ephesus. Justin had just converted to Christianity from a philosophical background and Trypho had just fled the disturbances in Judea.

When Justin suggests to Trypho to convert to Christianity, the dialogue becomes animated. Trypho criticizes Christians on a number of grounds, and Justin provides answers to each criticism.

In the opening of the Dialogue, Justin relates his vain search among the Stoics, Peripatetics, and Pythagoreans for a satisfying knowledge of God; his finding in the ideas of Plato wings for his soul, by the aid of which he hoped to attain the contemplation of the God-head; and his meeting on the sea-shore with an aged man who told him that by no human endeavor but only by divine revelation could this blessedness be attained, that the prophets had conveyed this revelation to man, and that their words had been fulfilled. Of the truth of this he assured himself by his own investigation; and the daily life of the Christians and the courage of the martyrs convinced him that the charges against them were unfounded. So he sought to spread the knowledge of Christianity as the true philosophy.

Justin also accuses Jews of being blind, fleshly beings who cannot see beyond the text of religious law: “For your ears are closed, your eyes are blinded, and the heart is hardened,' Jeremiah has cried; yet not even then do you listen. The Lawgiver is present, yet you do not see Him; to the poor the Gospel is preached, the blind see, yet you do not understand. You have now need of a second circumcision, though you glory greatly in the flesh.” This concept finds its origin in the New Testament: Paul writes in 2 Corinthians 3:13-15 that “to this very day whenever Moses is read, a veil lies over their minds; but when one turns to the Lord, the veil is removed.”

In the Dialogue, Justin also wrote, "For I choose to follow not men or men's doctrines, but God and the doctrines [delivered] by Him. For if you have fallen in with some who are called Christians, but who do not admit this [truth], and venture to blaspheme the God of Abraham, and the God of Isaac, and the God of Jacob; who say there is no resurrection of the dead, and that their souls, when they die, are taken to heaven; do not imagine that they are Christians." This passage is sometimes cited as evidence that the early church subscribed to the doctrine of soul sleep, though some claim that Justin's emphasis is on saying that denial of the resurrection of the dead is what makes them non-Christian, especially considering that he claims that "even after death souls are in a state of sensation" in Chapter 18 of his First Apology.

In his critical edition (with French translation), Philippe Bobichon demonstrates the particular nature of this text, equally influenced by Greek and Rabbinic thought.

Dating
Because the text mentions Justin Martyr's First Apology, which was written sometime between AD 150-155, Dialogue with Trypho must have been written after it. The date of authorship has been suggested to have been written anywhere between 155-167, with some scholars favoring 155–160, or even a more specific date, c. 160.

Authenticity

The Dialogue with Trypho and the two Apologies are universally accepted by scholars as authentic works of Justin. Though they are preserved only in the Sacra parallela, they were known to Tatian, Methodius of Olympus, and Eusebius and their influence is traceable in Athenagoras, Theophilus of Antioch, the Pseudo-Melito, and especially Tertullian. Eusebius speaks of two Apologies, but he quotes them both as one, which indeed they are in substance. The identity of authorship is backed up not only by the reference in chapter 120 of the Dialogue to the Apology, but by the unity of treatment. Zahn showed that the Dialogue was originally divided into two books, that there is a considerable lacuna in chapter 74, as well as at the beginning, and that it is probably based on an actual occurrence at Ephesus, the personality of the Rabbi Tarfon being employed, though in a Hellenized form.

Editions

English
 

Greek

See also
Dialogue of Jason and Papiscus

References

Further reading
 Rokeah, David (2002). Justin Martyr and the Jews. Brill.
  volume 1 online volume 2 online
 Bobichon, Philippe, "Œuvres de Justin Martyr : Le manuscrit de Londres (Musei Britannici Loan 36/13) apographon du manuscrit de Paris (Parisinus Graecus 450)" , Scriptorium 57/2 (2004), pp. 157–172 online
 Bobichon, Philippe, "Justin Martyr : étude stylistique du Dialogue avec Tryphon suivie d’une comparaison avec l’Apologie et le De resurrectione", Recherches augustiniennes et patristiques 34 (2005), pp. 1–61 online
 Bobichon, Philippe, "Comment Justin a-t-il acquis sa connaissance exceptionnelle des exégèses juives (contenus et méthodes) ?", Revue de Théologie et de Philosophie, 139, 2007, pp. 101–126 article online

2nd-century books
2nd-century Christian texts
Christian apologetic works
Christian theology books
Jewish apologetics
Jewish–Christian debate
Texts in Koine Greek